Cojedes is a town in the Venezuelan state of Cojedes.  This town is the shire town of the Anzoátegui Municipality and, according to the 2001 Venezuelan census, the municipality has a population of 14,044.

Demographics
The Anzoátegui Municipality, according to the 2001 Venezuelan census, has a population of 14,044 (up from 11,106 in 1990).  This amounts to 5.5% of Cojedes's population.

Government
Cojedes is the shire town of the Anzoátegui Municipality in Cojedes.  The mayor of the Anzoátegui Municipality is Luis Linares, reelected in 2004 with 44% of the vote.  The last municipal election was held in October 2004.

Notable people
Ivian Sarcos, a beauty queen who won the Miss World 2011 and Miss World Venezuela 2010 titles, is a native of Cojedes.

References

External links
 anzoategui-cojedes.gob.ve

Populated places in Cojedes (state)